The Big Bog on the island of Maui is the largest high-altitude bog in the Hawaiian Islands. It is located on East Maui Volcano's east rift zone, at the border between Hāna Forest Reserve and Haleakalā National Park.

Climate

The Big Bog has a tropical rainforest climate (Köppen Af), with no observable dry season and nearly constant torrential rainfall. However, the first full year of recorded data showed  of rainfall, which is one of the highest annual rainfall totals measured in the Hawaiian Islands. Clear days are essentially nonexistent, and even when it is not raining, it is almost certainly cloudy or foggy. The lack of adequate drainage has caused moisture to accumulate, forming the bog.

Causes
These trade winds condense to form clouds and precipitation. Its moniker as the cloudiest place in the Hawaiian Islands is verified by the fact that its average solar radiation and potential evapotranspiration are the lowest amongst recorded locations, and relative humidity and cloud attenuation are the highest.

Comparison with Mount Waiʻaleʻale

While the summit of Mount Waiʻaleʻale has long been considered the wettest place in the Hawaiian Islands, and thus Oceania, the Big Bog has a higher 30-year average. This would make the Big Bog the wettest location in the Hawaiian Islands and in Oceania, although many amateur sources cite Mount Waiʻaleʻale's precipitation as higher.

See also
 Mount Waiʻaleʻale
 Wettest places on Earth
 Hawaiʻi
 Maui

References

Geography of Maui